Xeloma are beetles from the subfamily Cetoniinae, tribe Cetoniini. The genus contains thirteen recognised species found in various countries of Sub-Saharan Africa.

Species 

Xeloma antoinei Beinhundner, 1999
Xeloma aspersa Péringuey, 1896
Xeloma atra (Thunberg, 1818)
Xeloma burmeisteri Arrow, 1941
Xeloma cicatricosa (Burmeister, 1842)
Xeloma leprosa (Burmeister, 1842)
Xeloma maura (Boheman, 1860
Xeloma minettii Antoine, 2009
Xeloma pilicollis Kraatz, 1882
Xeloma seticollis (Kraatz, 1880)
Xeloma tomentosa (Gory & Percheron, 1833)
Xeloma vuilleti Bourgoin, 1914
Xeloma werneri Beinhundner, 1999

References

Cetoniinae